Pok Hong Estate is a public housing estate in Sha Tin Wai, Sha Tin, New Territories, Hong Kong near Sha Tin Wai station. It consists of eight residential blocks completed in 1982, 1983 and 1985. Its site was originally a shallow sand beach near Sha Tin Hoi. Some of the flats were sold to the tenants through Tenants Purchase Scheme Phase 5 in 2002.

Background 
In the 1970s, the Hong Kong Government began to develop a new town in Sha Tin, and it filled the shallows and the adjacent Sha Tin Hoi to build Sha Kok Estate and Jat Min Chuen, and carried out blasting works in the vicinity of Pok Hong Estate; and the planning area number of the estate was numbered "Sha Tin Area 5A". Later, the government decided to build public housing there. When the name of the housing estate was initially determined, it was originally named Tsok Pok Hang Estate, and later shortened to Pok Hang Estate, and was officially named Pok Hong Estate in 1981, which also means "a lot of health".

Houses

Demographics 
According to the 2016 by-census, Pok Hong Estate had a population of 13,987. The median age was 52.3 and the majority of residents (98.4 per cent) were of Chinese ethnicity. The average household size was 2.7 people. The median monthly household income of all households (i.e. including both economically active and inactive households) was HK$22,000.

Politics 
Pok Hong Estate is located in Pok Hong constituency of the Sha Tin District Council. It is currently represented by Chiu Chu-pong, who was elected in the 2019 elections.

COVID-19 pandemic
Pok Tat House of Pok Hong Estate was put under lockdown from 19 February 2022.

See also 

 Public housing estates in Sha Tin

References

Residential buildings completed in 1982
Residential buildings completed in 1983
Residential buildings completed in 1985
Sha Tin
Public housing estates in Hong Kong
Tenants Purchase Scheme
1982 establishments in Hong Kong